Horodnia is a city in Chernihiv Raion, Chernihiv Oblast (province) of Ukraine. It has a city status since 1957. Horodnia hosts the administration of Horodnia urban hromada, one of the hromadas of Ukraine. Population:

Geography
Horodnia is situated on both banks of the Chibrizh river.

History
For the first time, Horodnia was mentioned in historical literature at the beginning of the 17th century. There are different ideas about the origin of its name. The pride of citizens is three cannons presented by Peter I for the heroism of the people of Horodnia during the Swedish invasion in 1709.

Until 18 July 2020, Horodnia was the administrative center of Horodnia Raion. The raion was abolished in July 2020 as part of the administrative reform of Ukraine, which reduced the number of raions of Chernihiv Oblast to five. The area of Horodnia Raion was merged into Chernihiv Raion.   

Horodnia was occupied by Russian forces during to the ongoing Russo-Ukrainian War. Russian forces were reported to have left the town on 1 April 2022.

Education
The town has two secondary schools, two boarding schools, a music school, and a sport school.

Notable people
Many famous people were born, lived and studied in Horodnia. Politician and the Prime Minister of Ukraine Oleksiy Honcharuk grew up and finished school in Horodnia.

References

External links
 The murder of the Jews of Horodnia during World War II, at Yad Vashem website.

Cities in Chernihiv Oblast
Gorodnyansky Uyezd
Cities of district significance in Ukraine
Holocaust locations in Ukraine